Severe Tropical Cyclone Thelma was a tropical cyclone that affected northern Australia from 6 December 1998 until 12 December 1998. Cyclone Thelma was one of the most intense tropical cyclones to be observed off the coast of Australia. It then moved across the Timor Sea before hitting the north Kimberley coast. Thelma was the first known Category 5 cyclone to be observed in the Timor Sea, and was also the most intense cyclone to threaten Darwin since Cyclone Tracy on Christmas Eve in 1974. Ten months after the storm's passage, the skull of an 81-year-old man, who was believed to have been swept away by flood waters, was discovered.

Meteorological history

A developing low in the Timor Sea in early December was named Thelma at 2 p.m. The new cyclone drifted slowly south while rapidly intensifying. Thelma's intensity increased from a Category 2 to a Category 4 during 7 December. Thelma turned towards the southwest and reached Category 5 intensity on the Australian scale just north of Bathurst Island at about 9 a.m. CST on 8 December (2330 UTC 7 December). CST (1030 UTC) on the 8 December, only two days after being named. Cyclone Thelma's rate of intensification was close to twice the average rate of most cyclones.

The cyclone weakened to a Category 3 while crossing the Kimberley coast northwest of Kuri Bay early on 11 December. The cyclone weakened rapidly while over land. Thelma was downgraded below cyclone strength late on 11 December while moving in a more southerly track. The ex-cyclone moved through the west Kimberley and Pilbara on 12 December and 13 December. It then moved southward through Pilbara and dissipated.

Preparations
All residents of major communities, including Darwin, and offshore installations directly affected by the cyclone were either evacuated or were sheltered in secure accommodation. The port of Darwin was closed during the cyclone, schools were closed for one day and public cyclone shelters were opened on the night of 8 December for people who felt insecure in their place of residence. Emergency officials evacuated about 120 people in the tiny community of Kalumburu, but about 180 people were left behind.

Impact
Overall, the damage caused by Cyclone Thelma was relatively light, compared with the cyclone's severe intensity. However, Thelma still had a significant impact on people's activities near the Tiwi Islands and the Kimberley coast.

In the Tiwi Islands, the most significant impact was disruption to communications and power supplies. The telephone service throughout the Tiwi Islands was shut down for over 24 hours. The radio and television reception was interrupted by heavy rain and lightning, and the power supply in Pirlangimpi (Garden Point) was cut by fallen trees. Around Bathurst Island and northwest Melville Island, there was extensive damage to vegetation in exposed areas. In Pirlangimpi, many large trees were uprooted and several houses were slightly damaged. In Nguiu, Bathurst Island Township, some trees were blown down but there was no significant damage.

In Darwin, there was minor damage to houses and minor disruption to power supplies, caused by falling trees. The rain caused local flooding in the rural areas around Darwin, blocking off some areas.

In the Kimberley region, there was minor damage to some buildings at Kalumburu and water level in the river rose to within  of the town. The BHP facilities at Troughton Island were affected by very destructive winds and heavy rainfall from the cyclone's core, damaging the runway and buildings. Only minor damage was received at the pearling facilities at Vansittart Bay and Kuri Bay, mainly to floating pontoons. McGowan Island, to the north of Kalumburu received  of rain between 9 December and 13 December. Parts of east Pilbara also reported heavy rains over several days. Marble Bar recorded  and Newman recorded  in a two-day period.

Retirement
The name Thelma was removed from the official list of tropical cyclone names set out by the Tropical Cyclone Warning Centre in Darwin. It was replaced with the name Tasha.

See also

 Tropical cyclone
 List of tropical cyclones

References

External links
 Report of Thelma from Bureau of Meteorology
 Track of Thelma from Australian Severe Weather
 Track of Thelma from Unisys

1998–99 Australian region cyclone season
Tropical cyclones in the Northern Territory
Cyclone Thelma
Retired Australian region cyclones
Category 5 Australian region cyclones
Tropical cyclones in Western Australia